Joseph Theodore Sternaman (February 1, 1900 – March 10, 1988) was an American professional football player who was a quarterback for eight seasons for the Chicago Bears and Duluth Kelleys of the National Football League (NFL). At 5'6" and 135 pounds he was called "the strongest little man I ever met" by sportswriter Grantland Rice. He played quarterback during the years Red Grange starred with the Bears. In 1926, he was the quarterback, head coach, and owner of the Chicago Bulls of the first American Football League. 

Sternaman was born in Springfield, Illinois. He was the brother of Chicago Bears co-owner Dutch Sternaman.

References

1900 births
1988 deaths
Chicago Bears players
Duluth Kelleys players
Illinois Fighting Illini football players
Sportspeople from Springfield, Illinois
Players of American football from Illinois